Greg Nicol (born 2 April 1975) is a South African former field hockey player who competed in the 1996 Summer Olympics and in the 2004 Summer Olympics. On 23 December 2021 he was announced as the new head coach of the New Zealand men's national team.Greg Nicol served as assistant coach, in various forms, since 2006 for the Vantage Black Sticks Men’s (VBS) at the Beijing Olympics, and then at the Rio Olympics in 2016. He was also an assistant coach for the VBS Women at the London Olympics in 2012.
In 2017 Nicol took on the challenge of a newly created role as the Athlete Pathway Manager. In this role he was successful in laying the foundations for a national talent development system for hockey in New Zealand for which HNZ are now reaping the benefits. Nicol left this position to pursue other opportunities in 2019.

He is 5th on the all time goal scoring list, 3rd highest since the advent of astro turf. Achieving the record over the shortest playing period of those with more than 200 goals.(*4 April 2020) https://en.m.wikipedia.org/wiki/List_of_men%27s_field_hockey_players_with_100_or_more_international_goals

References

External links

1975 births
Living people
South African male field hockey players
Olympic field hockey players of South Africa
Field hockey players at the 1996 Summer Olympics
Field hockey players at the 2004 Summer Olympics
2002 Men's Hockey World Cup players
Field hockey players at the 1998 Commonwealth Games
Field hockey players at the 2002 Commonwealth Games
Commonwealth Games competitors for South Africa
South African field hockey coaches
University of KwaZulu-Natal alumni
South African expatriates in New Zealand